Color line may refer to:

Color line (racism)
Color Line (ferry operator)
Baseball color line